|}

The Kennel Gate Novices Hurdle is a Grade 2 National Hunt hurdle race in Britain. It is run at Ascot a distance of about 2 miles (1 mile 7 furlongs and 152 yards, or 3,156 metres), and during its running there are eight hurdles to be jumped. The race is scheduled to take place each year in early December. It is currently sponsored by Sky Bet and run as the Sky Bet Supreme Trial Novices' Hurdle.

Winners

See also
 Horse racing in Great Britain
 List of British National Hunt races

References
 Racing Post:

National Hunt races in Great Britain
Ascot Racecourse
National Hunt hurdle races